Vijay Kumar Dev is the new State Election Commissioner of Delhi.

References

 

Living people
Indian Administrative Service officers
Year of birth missing (living people)
Place of birth missing (living people)
People from Delhi